"Tru-Kvlt-Metal" is the second non-official and third single song by American melodic metalcore band All That Remains from their seventh album, The Order of Things. It was released February 10, 2015.

Song meaning

Phil Labonte stated about the song: "Tru-Kvlt-Metal" is really sarcastic. It's really directed towards the people that we've heard year after year, record after record, saying, 'Oh, put out another record like The Fall Of Ideals. We've done that, and even if we did it, some purist would say it's tarnished anyway because we've already done it. You can't win, so (the song) is kind of like flicking my nose at them and giving them the bird."

Reception
AllMusic reviewer James Christopher Monger criticized the track, saying the song "goes so far as to call out those who have cast doubt on the band's authenticity, and does so amidst a barrage of alt-metal tropes that must have taken minutes to conjure."

Track listing

Personnel

All That Remains

Philip Labonte - lead vocals
 Oli Herbert - lead guitar
 Mike Martin - rhythm guitar
 Jeanne Sagan - bass guitar, backing vocals
 Jason Costa - drums

Additional

 Josh Wilbur - Production
 TBA - Mixing
 TBA - Mastering
 TBA - Artwork

References

2015 singles
All That Remains (band) songs
2015 songs
Razor & Tie singles
Songs written by Jason Costa
Songs written by Philip Labonte